MS NKS 1867 4° is a 1760 paper manuscript now in the Danish Royal Library, Copenhagen (section Den nye kongelige samling). It contains skaldic poetry, assorted runological information, the Prose Edda and the Poetic Edda, plus Sólarljóð, and 16 illustrations based on the Eddas.

References

External links

Page at Danish Royal Library

1760 books
18th-century manuscripts
Poetry anthologies
Literary illuminated manuscripts
Icelandic literature